Pastor Vega (12 February 1940 – 2 June 2005) was a Cuban film director and screenwriter. He directed nine films between 1964 and 2003. His 1979 film Portrait of Teresa was entered into the 11th Moscow International Film Festival.

Selected filmography
 Portrait of Teresa (1979)

References

External links

1940 births
2005 deaths
Cuban film directors
Cuban screenwriters
Cuban male writers
Male screenwriters
People from Havana
20th-century screenwriters